Dolgovo is a rural locality (a village) in Kubenskoye Rural Settlement, Vologodsky District, Vologda Oblast, Russia. The population was 9 as of 2002.

Geography 
The distance to Vologda is 36 km, to Kubenskoye is 6 km. Kulemesovo, Midyanovo, Ileykino, Korotkovo, Nastasyino, Morino, Sopyatino, Okulovo are the nearest rural localities.

References 

Rural localities in Vologodsky District